Meymanatabad (also Romanized as Meymanatābād; also known as Meymūnābād) is a village in Meymanat Rural District of Golestan District of Baharestan County, Tehran province, Iran. At the 2006 National Census, its population was 6,135 in 1,447 households, when it was in Robat Karim County. The following census in 2011 counted 6,828 people in 1,745 households, by which time the district, together with Bostan District, had been separated from the county and Baharestan County established. The latest census in 2016 showed a population of 5,821 people in 1,615 households; it was the larger of the two villages in its rural district.

References 

Baharestan County

Populated places in Tehran Province

Populated places in Baharestan County